Celestine Lazarus (born 13 November 1992) is a professional Nigerian footballer who plays for Slavoj Trebišov.

Club career

Podbeskidzie Bielsko-Biała
He made his professional Ekstraklasa debut for Podbeskidzie Bielsko-Biała against KS Cracovia on 1 August 2015.

Gönyeli and return to Slavoj Trebišov
After a good season with Slavoj Trebišov in Slovakia, Lazarus moved to Turkish Cypriot club Gönyeli at the end of August 2019. He joined the club officially on 12 September 2019, but however, after only two games, he resigned again on 25 September 2019. Lazarus then returned to Slavoj in 2020.

References

External links
 
 Futbalnet profile
 

1992 births
Living people
Nigerian footballers
Nigerian expatriate footballers
Association football defenders
Budapest Honvéd FC players
FK Bodva Moldava nad Bodvou players
Podbeskidzie Bielsko-Biała players
MFK Zemplín Michalovce players
MFK Lokomotíva Zvolen players
FK Spišská Nová Ves players
FK Slavoj Trebišov players
Gönyeli S.K. players
Ekstraklasa players
2. Liga (Slovakia) players
Slovak Super Liga players
Nigerian expatriate sportspeople in Italy
Nigerian expatriate sportspeople in Hungary
Nigerian expatriate sportspeople in Slovakia
Nigerian expatriate sportspeople in Poland
Nigerian expatriate sportspeople in Cyprus
Expatriate footballers in Italy
Expatriate footballers in Hungary
Expatriate footballers in Slovakia
Expatriate footballers in Poland
Expatriate footballers in Cyprus